Barbara De Fina (born 1946) is an American film producer. She has been called an "integral component" who has made "critical contributions" as producer of many of Martin Scorsese's films.

Biography
Her grandfather was from Sicily and her grandmother from Hungary, and she grew up in an immigrant community. She got her start in the world of low-budget filmmaking, before meeting Martin Scorsese during the making of After Hours. The two were married on February 8, 1985.

Among her well-known films are The Color of Money, Goodfellas, The Age of Innocence, Casino,  The Last Temptation of Christ and The Grifters. In 2001 she and the production team of the film You Can Count on Me were presented the Independent Spirit Award for Best First Feature.

Barbara De Fina also produced Michael Jackson's music video "Bad" with Quincy Jones.

De Fina and Scorsese divorced in 1991, but continued working together on projects for decades after that.

Awards and nominations

References

External links

Photos of Barbara De Fina via Getty Images

Living people
1949 births
American film producers
Artists from New Jersey